The 2008–09 ISU Speed Skating World Cup, officially the Essent ISU World Cup Speed Skating 2008–2009, was a series of  international speed skating competitions which ran the entire season. The season started on 7 November 2008 in Berlin, Germany, and ended on 7 March 2009 in Salt Lake City, United States. In total, nine competition weekends were held at eight different locations, twelve cups were contested (six for men, and six for women), and 84 races took place. The World Cup is organized by the International Skating Union (ISU).

Calendar

Note: the men's 5000 and 10000 metres were contested as one cup, and the women's 3000 and 5000 metres were contested as one cup, as indicated by the color coding.

World records

World records going into the 2008–09 season.

Men

At the World Cup stop in Salt Lake City on 6 March 2009, Shani Davis of the United States set a new world record on the men's 1500 metres with a time of 1:41.80. The next day, Davis' countryman Trevor Marsicano first set a new world record on the 1000 metres distance with a time of 1:06.88, after which Davis improved it further, with a time of 1:06.42.

Women

Men's standings

100 m

500 m

1000 m

1500 m

5000 and 10000 m

Team pursuit

Women's standings

100 m

500 m

1000 m

1500 m

3000 and 5000 m

Team pursuit

References

External links
International Skating Union

 
08-09
Isu Speed Skating World Cup, 2008-09
Isu Speed Skating World Cup, 2008-09